The 2008 NFL Draft was the 73rd annual meeting of National Football League (NFL) franchises to select newly eligible American football players. The draft took place at Radio City Music Hall in New York City, New York, on April 26 and April 27, 2008. For the 29th consecutive year, ESPN televised the draft; the NFL Network also broadcast the event, its third year doing so. Of the 252 selections, 220 were regular selections in rounds one through seven, and 32 were compensatory selections, distributed among rounds three through seven. As of the end of the 2018 season, 27 players have been selected to the Pro Bowl.

For the first time since the common draft began, no wide receiver was selected in the first round. For the first time ever, the first two picks had the same last name (Jake and Chris Long; they were unrelated). Also, a then-record 34 trades were made during the draft itself. The number of trades was later broken in 2017.

Changes for 2008
The schedule for the draft was changed: day one began at 3:00 PM.EDT (1900 UTC), instead of noon, and consisted of just two rounds. Day two began with round three at 10:00 AM EDT (1400 UTC), instead of 11:00 AM. Moreover, the time limits for day one selections were reduced, from 15 minutes to ten for first-round picks and from ten minutes to seven in the second. The limit remained five minutes for all picks in rounds three through seven.

The draft also marked the official debut of a new NFL shield logo, replacing the old shield logo which had been used since 1970, featuring eight white stars to represent each of the league's eight divisions, and a football rotated to the same angle as the one on the top of the Vince Lombardi Trophy given to the Super Bowl champion.

Player breakdown 
The following is the breakdown of the 252 players by position:

Player selections

Trades
In the explanations below, (PD) indicates trades completed prior to the start of the draft (i.e. Pre-Draft), while (D) denotes trades that took place during the 2008 draft.

Round one

Round two

Round three

Round four

Round five

Round six

Round seven

Draft day trades

Fifth round
Redskins to Rams. Washington traded fifth-round and seventh-round selections (#157 and #228 overall) to St. Louis for its two sixth-round selections (#168 and #180 overall).

Sixth round
Ravens to Texans.  See first-round trade above.
Steelers to Giants. See fourth-round trade above.
Eagles to Browns. Philadelphia traded to Cleveland the 6th round selection they had previously received from the Browns for Hank Fraley (#191 overall). (see Pre-Draft Trades above)  In return, the Browns gave the Eagles their 5th round pick in the 2009 draft.

Seventh round
Cowboys to Seahawks.  See first-round trade above.
Raiders to Cowboys. See fourth-round trade above.
Cowboys to Jaguars. See fifth-round trade above.
Packers to Vikings. See fifth-round trade above.
Patriots to Buccaneers. See fifth-round trade above.

Notable undrafted players

Draft breakdown

By conference
Selection totals by college conference:

By position

References
Trade references

Specific references

External links
 NFL Draft at NFL.com
 ESPN NFL Draft Central 2008

National Football League Draft
D
Radio City Music Hall
NFL draft
NFL Draft
American football in New York City
2000s in Manhattan
Sporting events in New York City
Sports in Manhattan